R v Hertfordshire CC, ex p Green Environmental Industries Ltd [2001] UKHL 11 is a UK environmental law and human rights case, concerning the interests of the public in investigating breaches of environmental law, and the right to a fair trial under European Convention on Human Rights (ECHR article 6). It held that the ability of environmental protection authorities to demand information that could potentially be self-incriminating was not the same as requiring people incriminate themselves in trials. Therefore, a company that had been found to have unlawfully stored dangerous clinical waste could be compelled to produce evidence of further breaches.

Facts
In June 1996 Green Environmental Industries Ltd and Mr John Moynihan were charged with offences under section 33 of the Environmental Protection Act 1990. In November 1995 a 100 tonnes of clinical waste (including placenta, needles and glass) was found in trailers and at a warehouse near in the Rookery Transport Cafe near Hatfield, and in the centre of Hertford, on Ware Road at the Addis factory site. The property was leased or licensed to GEI Ltd, which did not have a licence for its storage. Moynihan as director and sole shareholder was asked by the council on 23 November 1995 to remove the waste or the council would under EPA 1990 ss 33 and 59 do it at Moynihan’s expense. Moynihan replied by fax, and the council removed the waste for £200,000. Two weeks later, under EPA 1990 section 71(2) it demanded that Moynihan provide details of (1) people, companies and hospitals hat had supplied waste to Green (2) who carried waste on its behalf (3) staff employed to handle the waste (4) companies Green employed to dispose of the waste (5) suppliers or hirers of the trailers (6) keepers of any vehicles used to collect the waste (7) locations of any other sites Green used and (8) where three bins previously at the site now were. On the advice of his solicitor, Green replied he would give information if he was given the assurance that none of it would be used a prosecution. The council stood its ground and on 6 February 1996 Moynihan lost his case in front of a magistrate, and appeals to the High Court and Court of Appeal were dismissed. Moynihan and GEI Ltd argued that EPA 1990 s 71 breach the right to a fair trial and against self-incrimination under ECHR art 6.

Judgment
Lord Hoffmann held that according to domestic law, and the jurisprudence of the ECHR, the EPA 1990 s 70 did not breach the privilege against self-incrimination, nor ECHR art 6 right to a fair trial. The information that had to be given was only due before any hearing took place, and there was no guarantee that proceedings would ever be brought. The information could be given in the person’s own time and on advice. It was different to being under questioning by a judge in a court. His judgment went as follows.

Lord Steyn, Lord Cooke, Lord Hobhouse and Lord Slynn concurred.

See also

UK company law
O'Halloran v United Kingdom (2008) 46 EHRR 21, suggest article 6 can be limited if national authorities have a clear and proper public objective, on the Road Traffic Act 1988 s 172, for speeding.

Notes

References

United Kingdom administrative case law
House of Lords cases
2001 in case law
2001 in British law
Hertfordshire County Council
2000s in Hertfordshire